Wanhua Lou, also translated into English as Pavilion of Myriad Flowers and Pavilion of Ten Thousand Flowers, is a Chinese novel written by Li Yutang (李雨堂) during the Qing dynasty. The novel's story is set in the Song dynasty and consist of 68 chapters.  Its first edition was published in 1808, with later expanded editions releasing throughout the following decades.

References

Chinese classic novels
19th-century Chinese novels
1808 novels